Reckless Tortuga is a YouTube web-based comedy channel consisting of several major web series and other side projects. The channel first attracted popularity in early 2010 when they first aired The Online Gamer, however; they were also known for the series Psycho Girlfriend before its introduction.

Reckless Tortuga was one of the larger comedy groups on YouTube and its members participated in events such as VidCon and San Diego Comic-Con International. By 2014, the Reckless Tortuga YouTube Channel was listed on New Media Rockstars Top 100 Channels, ranked at #28. By October 2015, the channel had over 235 million video views and over 1,000,000 subscribers.

Aside from their main sketches, Reckless Tortuga were also working on projects such as Racism in America, Park It Up, The Sketch Lab, and Extra Butter, Please. Reckless Tortuga was formed by Lindsey Reckis, Jason Schnell, Eric Pumphrey.

Citing ever-changing YouTube terms of service leading to the removal of popular past videos and impacting the viability of continued use of the platform, Reckless Tortuga sold their subscriber base to an unrelated comedy troupe and exited YouTube in early 2019. Reckless Tortuga returned on March 3, 2020 by re-uploading episodes of The cLAN spin-off of the Online Gamer which was previously housed on the now defunct Machinima Prime channel. The group is now back to making videos again. Reckless Tortuga have continued to produce videos during the COVID-19 lockdown and have full control of the YouTube channels.

Channels 
There are two extra channels in addition to the main channel which features extra footage and content.

Reckless Tortuga
The main "Reckless Tortuga" channel, where most content is posted onto YouTube. The upload schedule is irregular and often subjected to change. Video length for each series vary but ranges from as much as 2 minutes to 9 minutes. The channel started on May 30, 2008.

Reckless Tortuga Two
The secondary channel "Reckless Tortuga Two" mainly features behind the scene footage which may include commentary or bloopers. The channel started on February 8, 2011.

Reckless Noobs
The channel "Reckless Noobs" features the cast and crew of Reckless Tortuga playing various video games such as Call of Duty: Black Ops, Mass Effect 3, and Grand Theft Auto IV. The commentary and reactions from the players alongside the game play is recorded in a split screen manner. The channel started on February 9, 2011.

Series 
The Online Gamer
The Online Gamer is the signature series for Reckless Tortuga. The sketch follows the life of an avid gamer, Aaron (Eric Pumphrey), whose obsession with video games has cast him as a social pariah. Aaron's inability to cope with social norms and his tendency to treat life as a video game has caused his family and friends to reject him. The series is known for its vulgar language and the use of videogames references in real life. The cast also includes Aaron's girlfriend, Becka (Lynsey Bartilson), his coworker, Ted (Davan O'Firinn), his new boss, Damian (Tommy Savas), and his clan buddy Sam (Luke Baybak). The series started on December 23, 2009. Reckless Tortuga soon made an expansion series called "The Clan" (stylized as TH3 cLAN) following Aaron and his new clan preparing for the upcoming Machinima Tournament. The cast includes Aaron's closest friend Sam (Luke Baybak), former television star Mike (Dylan Saunders) and a not-very-grown-up gamer named Josh (Kyle S. Moore). The series is only on MachinimaPrime although there are The Online Gamer episodes that "cross-over" to clan episodes. Aaron's character was the main reason that made The Online Gamer the best show of the channel.

Psycho Girlfriend
Psycho Girlfriend was the most popular series prior to The Online Gamer and remains to be one of the top series of Reckless Tortuga. The series revolve around the destructive and unhealthy relationship of Seth (Tommy Savas) and Brandy (Lindsey Reckis). Brandy's possession of insane and obsessive behavior outside of the social convention and Seth's inability to escape the relationship is the basis for the show. The series started on March 2, 2009.

Henchmen
The show consists of two henchmen who possess below average intelligence. They often perform tasks for a covert mob boss throughout the series and attempts to advance in the ranks. However, their immature behavior and lapse in judgement prevents them from doing so and often leads them to laughable situations. The series started on October 9, 2010.

Racism in America
Racism and stereotypes are satirized through awkward situations in this series. A person of a certain ethnicity in every episode is involved in a prejudiced situation that is eased through either comical or vengeful means after having performed several monologues explaining the situation. The series started on February 17, 2010.

Extra Butter, Please
Extra Butter, Please creates parodies of movies, sometimes revamping its ideas and other times mocking it. Films such as The Avengers, The Dark Knight Rises, and Prometheus have been featured in several episodes. One of the sub series in these sketches is Cops, which is the law enforcement counterpart to Henchmen while drawing from other films. The series started on August 11, 2011.

Neurotica
The protagonist, Mitchell (Morgan Krantz) suffers from neuroticism and exhibits high levels of anxiety, moodiness, and jealousy. A regular situation is over analyzed and the audience is taken through Mitchell's train of thought in the form of a visual depiction and monologue. Then an unexpected or surprising outcome occurs either through the protagonist's actions or inaction. The series started on March 27, 2012.

Park It Up
Park It Up is a mockumentary style sketch that follows the mundane life of a parking enforcement officer, Lenny (Luke Baybak). Lenny is a passive and socially awkward person who gets pushed around by his coworkers and people he tickets. He often gets into awkward situations and masks his anguish in his interviews. The series started on January 10, 2012.

Creepy Neighbor
Creepy Neighbor features the confrontational meetings between two neighbors. The male neighbor (Luke Baybak) is hyper aggressive and disturbed while the female character (Lindsey Reckis) possesses normal qualities. Threats of violence and hints of surveillance is made by male role, which leaves the female neighbor deeply concerned each episode. The series started on May 10, 2011.

Bad Friends
The series show the dysfunctional relationship between a normal character (Eric Pumphrey) and his socially awkward friends. The normal counterpart in the relationship would deal with the different issues caused his friends who push the social norms to the extreme. The situations in the sketch are so severely bizarre that it leaves the main character in a complete state of confusion. The series started on April 4, 2011.

The Sketch Lab
The Sketch Lab is a corner for side projects and single sketches by Reckless Tortuga. This is the area that does not contain series, but individual videos for any single idea. The Sketch Lab started on February 1, 2010.

The Basement
The Basement is a completed series that featured teenagers tampering with supernatural forces. A group of teenagers in a basement jokes around with an ouija board and gets trapped by an evil spirit. They are then faced with the challenge of escaping their predicament alive. The series started on August 11, 2009 and ended on April 29, 2011.

References

External links 
Official Reckless Tortuga website

YouTube channels
YouTube original programming